"Shot Reverse Shot" is a song by American musician Jack Johnson from his 2013 album From Here to Now to You. The song is the third and final single from the album, and was released on  December 23, 2013.

Composition 
Johnson wrote the song about Shot reverse shot, a technique frequently used by film editors to set up a scene where two characters talk to one another in a motion picture. The song also features references of his wife Kim Johnson.

Release 
The radio edit of the song was released on December 23, 2013. A one track promotional single for the album was released in the UK.

Music video 
The music video for the song was released on December 24, 2013, and spawned over 1 million views on YouTube. The video was shot frame by frame while Johnson was on his From Here to Now to You Tour in Australia and New Zealand.

Track listing

CD single 

 "Shot Reverse Shot" - 3:04

References 

2013 songs
2013 singles
Jack Johnson (musician) songs
Songs written by Jack Johnson (musician)